Squalor refers to filthiness and degradation, as from neglect or poverty.

Squalor may also refer to:

 Squalor (comic), a limited series by Stefan Petrucha and Tom Sutton
 Student squalor, various situations of student housing
 Senile Squalor Syndrome (Diogenes syndrome) characterised by extreme self neglect and hoarding.

Characters in A Series of Unfortunate Events  
 Esmé Squalor
 Jerome Squalor